Russell Wong (born March 1, 1963) is an American actor of film and television. He was one of the first actors of Chinese descent to hold a leading role in a primetime American television series, portraying Jian-Wa with Chi Muoi Lo portraying Wago in the highly rated critically acclaimed Vanishing Son, first in a series of a made-for-television films followed by a 13-episode syndicated series. He has appeared in numerous films and series including Abel Ferrara's China Girl, New Jack City, The Joy Luck Club, Takedown, The Monkey King, Romeo Must Die, and The Mummy: Tomb of the Dragon Emperor.

Early life
The sixth of seven children, Wong was born in Troy, New York; the son of Connie Van Yserloo, an American artist of French and Dutch descent and Chinese American restaurateur William Wong. His family moved to Albany when he was a baby, where his father ran a restaurant. When Wong was seven years old, his parents divorced, and he moved with his mother to California, settling near Yosemite. In 1981, Wong graduated from Mariposa County High School, and that fall enrolled at Santa Monica City College.

Career
Wong supported himself as a photographer and as a dancer (appearing in rock videos with David Bowie, Donna Summer, and Janet Jackson, among others) before scoring his first screen roles in 1985, appearing in a Hong Kong musical called Ge wu sheng ping (aka Musical Dancer) and in a screen adaptation of James Clavell's best-seller Tai-Pan (as Gordon Chen). A number of television and film roles followed, including an appearance as Narong Bansari on an episode of the 80s crime show The Equalizer, but Wong began breaking into better roles in 1989, when he made a memorable guest appearance on the drama series 21 Jump Street (as Locke in the episode "The Dragon and the Angel") and won a leading role in Wayne Wang's acclaimed independent romantic comedy Eat a Bowl of Tea as Ben Loy. He also played a rising Chinese American gangster named Yung Gan in Abel Ferrara's China Girl, a Romeo and Juliet love story film about the conflicts between Chinese gangsters and the Italian mob in New York.

Supporting roles in China Cry (as Lam Cheng Shen), China White (as Bobby Chow) and New Jack City (as Park) were to follow, and Wong found himself working with Wayne Wang again when he was cast as Lin Xiao in the film adaptation of Amy Tan's best-selling novel The Joy Luck Club.

Wong's breakthrough role came in 1994, when he was cast in the leading role in the short lived TV series Vanishing Son, in which he played a Chinese political activist exiled in America. The show was popular enough to spawn three sequels, and was later spun off into a syndicated TV series. People magazine named him one of fifty "Beautiful People" in 1995.

After Vanishing Son ran its course, Wong moved on to more big-screen work, including major roles in Prophecy II (as Danyael), The Tracker (as Rick Tsung), and Romeo Must Die (as the antagonist Kai to Jet Li's hero Han Sing), as well as the made-for-TV epic The Lost Empire, where he played the title character, The Monkey King. He also played Lieutenant Tong in the film Twisted starring Ashley Judd, Samuel L. Jackson, Andy Garcia and directed by Philip Kaufman.

In 2003, he was cast as the lead in a TV series created by Robert Mark Kamen and Carlton Cuse entitled Black Sash, where he played a former narcotics cop named Tom Chang who opens up a martial arts school in San Francisco left to him by his teacher, Master Li (played by Mako), to teach a number of young students "the art of 8 palm changes" or Baguazhang. The series also starred Missy Peregrym, Corey Sevier, Ray J, Sarah Carter, and Drew Fuller. Although 8 episodes were made, 6 ended up airing on The WB.

Wong also voiced the main character, an undercover cop named Nick Kang, in the video game True Crime: Streets of LA (2003). In the late 2000s, he starred as General Ming Guo opposite Michelle Yeoh and Jet Li in The Mummy: Tomb of the Dragon Emperor (2008) directed by Rob Cohen and as Patrick in the Thailand action film The Sanctuary alongside Michael B, Inthira Charoenpura and Patharawarin Timkul. He also appeared as Leon in Chris Chan Lee's independent film Undoing (2006) opposite Sung Kang and Kelly Hu, and Anna Chi's Dim Sum Funeral (2008), opposite Bai Ling and Talia Shire. He also guest starred on a number of TV shows such as CSI: Crime Scene Investigation (as Lieutenant Arthur Chen), Just Legal (as the District Attorney in the pilot episode), Commander in Chief (as a Cabinet member), and Numb3rs (as Jeremy Wang).

In the 2010s, Wong appeared in the TV series Nikita (as Victor Han), Hawaii Five-0 (as Kong Liang; he also appeared as Nick Wong in the 1997 Hawaii Five-O TV movie), and HBO Asia's Serangoon Road (as Winston, the husband of Joan Chen's character) in 2013. Film wise, Wong was involved with a number of films shot in Asia or China, reuniting again with Wayne Wang for Snow Flower and the Secret Fan (2011) (as the Bank CEO at the beginning that gives a speech to Archie Kao and Li Bingbing) and as Peter in the Chinese language remake of the film What Women Want (2011) starring Andy Lau and Gong Li.

In 2014, Wong finished shooting a horror series entitled Grace which was shot in Singapore for HBO Asia, and also directed by Serangoon Road co-director Tony Tilse. He plays the patriarch of the family, Roy Chan.

Wong also played the character of Brompton in three 2020 episodes of the HBO series Westworld, and appeared as Dr. Yu in the 2021 movie Clifford the Big Red Dog.

Personal life
Wong has one daughter, Eja Robinson-Wong (born 1988), with dancer Eartha Robinson. He was married to Hong Kong-based designer Flora Cheong-Leen. They divorced in 2012.

He is the brother of Michael Wong, a Hong Kong-based actor.

Filmography

Film

Television

Video games

References

External links
 
 UCLA Asia Pacific Arts Interview
 
 Starpulse

1963 births
Living people
Male actors from New York (state)
American male film actors
American people of Dutch descent
American people of French descent
American male taekwondo practitioners
American male karateka
American wushu practitioners
American male actors of Chinese descent
American male television actors
American male video game actors
American male voice actors
Actors from Troy, New York
Santa Monica College alumni
American expatriates in Hong Kong
20th-century American male actors
21st-century American male actors